Taavi Rõivas' second cabinet was the cabinet of Estonia, in office from 9 April 2015 to 23 November 2016. It is a coalition cabinet of liberal centre-right Estonian Reform Party, Social Democratic Party and conservative Pro Patria and Res Publica Union.

History

On 7 November 2016, the Social Democratic Party and Pro Patria and Res Publica Union announced that they were asking Prime Minister Taavi Rõivas to resign and were planning on negotiating a new majority government. The announcement came soon after the opposition had submitted a motion to express lack of confidence in Rõivas’ government. SDE and IRL proceeded to support the motion, leaving the Reform the only party to support Rõivas. Rõivas commented the situation by declining to resign and arguing that a democratically elected government should be only removed by a democratic vote. In the following vote of confidence on 9 November, the majority of Riigikogu voted in favor of removing the prime minister’s government. In the following coalition talks Center Party, SDE and IRL formed a new coalition led by Center Party's chairman Jüri Ratas. The new coalition was sworn in on 23 November.

Ministers 

|-
! colspan=6 | Source

Resignations 

On 1 July 2015 Minister of Foreign Affairs, Keit Pentus-Rosimannus, resigned due to a court decision which made her partly liable for debts accumulated by her father's bankrupt company. Reform Party decided to nominate independent Marina Kaljurand as her successor.

On 30 August 2015 The Social Democrat council vote whether to continue in the government coalition, with the result turning out positive Urve Palo, the Minister of Entrepreneurship, resigned in protest. She was replaced with Liisa Oviir. Social Democrats also decided to bring their new chairman Jevgeni Ossinovski into the government as Minister of Health and Labour. The Minister of Defence and former chairman of Social Democrats Sven Mikser was replaced with Hannes Hanso.

On 9 September 2016 Minister of Foreign Affairs, Marina Kaljurand, announced her resignation to run independently in the 2016 Estonian presidential election. She had previously been the favourite for Reform Party nominee, but was eventually dropped in favour of Siim Kallas.  In a ministerial reshuffle Jürgen Ligi was moved from the chair of Minister of Education to Minister of Foreign Affairs with Maris Lauri taking his seat in the Ministry of Education and Research.

References

External links
Official Website of Estonian Government

Cabinets of Estonia
2015 establishments in Estonia
Cabinets established in 2015
2016 disestablishments in Estonia
Cabinets disestablished in 2016